Javier Revuelta (born 7 March 1957) is a Spanish equestrian. He competed in two events at the 1996 Summer Olympics.

References

External links
 

1957 births
Living people
Spanish male equestrians
Olympic equestrians of Spain
Equestrians at the 1996 Summer Olympics
Sportspeople from Valladolid